The Butterflies of Zagorsk was a documentary produced by the BBC, narrated by Michael Dean, and first broadcast in the United Kingdom in 1990.

The series
Teacher's Story, A – Out of the Wilderness (1990)
Teacher's Story, A – Socrates for Six Year Olds (1990)
Teacher's Story, A – The Butterflies of Zagorsk (1990)

External links
The Butterflies of Zagorsk

BBC television documentaries
Special education
1990 television specials